Morteza Dashti is an Iranian Paralympic powerlifter. He represented Iran at the 2004 Summer Paralympics and at the 2008 Summer Paralympics and he won the gold medal in the men's 48 kg event in 2004. In 2008, he competed in the men's 48 kg event without a successful lift.

References

External links 
 

Living people
Year of birth missing (living people)
Place of birth missing (living people)
Powerlifters at the 2004 Summer Paralympics
Powerlifters at the 2008 Summer Paralympics
Medalists at the 2004 Summer Paralympics
Paralympic gold medalists for Iran
Paralympic medalists in powerlifting
Paralympic powerlifters of Iran
21st-century Iranian people